The Newlin Mill Complex, also referred to as The Newlin Grist Mill, is a water-powered gristmill on the west branch of Chester Creek near Concordville, Pennsylvania built in 1704 by Nathaniel and Mary Newlin and operated commercially until 1941. During its three centuries of operation, the mill has been known as the Lower Mill, the Markham Mill, the Seventeen-O-Four Mill and the Concord Flour Mill. In 1958 the mill property was bought by E. Mortimer Newlin, restored and given to the Nicholas Newlin Foundation to use as a historical park. Water power is still used to grind corn meal which is sold on site.

History (1683-1739)
 
Nicholas Newlin was a member of the Religious Society of Friends and an Irishman who lived in the Quaker town of Mountmellick, in Queens County, Ireland. In May, 1683, Newlin, fleeing religious persecution, emigrated to Pennsylvania with his wife, Elizabeth, and three children: Nathaniel, Rachel, and John, on the ship Levee from Liverpool.

Newlin was a prominent citizen, serving on the province's governing body, the Provincial Council in 1686 and 1687, as a Justice of the Peace, and on the Courts of Chester County.

Newlin's son, Nathaniel, married Mary Mendenhall in 1684. In 1685, Mary Mendenhall received additional land as part of a grant to her and her siblings.

Nathaniel and Mary Mendenhall built the present mill, the third gristmill in the township, in 1704. Nathaniel also served as a Justice of the Peace, and on the Courts of Chester County, and served in the Provincial Assembly from 1698 to 1722. Through Nathaniel's inheritance from his father, and the land Mary Mendenhall held, and by their purchase of  that became Newlin Township, they became together one of the largest landowners in Chester County.  When Nathaniel Newlin died intestate in 1729, shortly after Mary Mendenhall died, the land was divided under Pennsylvania law among their children with the oldest son, Nicholas, receiving a double portion, and all the daughters and other sons, including a son named Nathaniel Newlin, each a single portion.

History (1739-pres.) 
In 1739, Nathaniel's grandson via his son Nathaniel, Nathaniel Newlin III, built a house for the head miller.  In 1742, William and Anne Trimble, the owners of a neighboring gristmill, built a house overlooking the Newlin mill. A mile to the west in the village of Concordville, Nathaniel's son Nicholas built the Nicholas Newlin House in 1742; which is listed separately on the National Register of Historic Places. In 1777, the Battle of Brandywine was fought within a few miles of the mill. General George Washington had ordered the removal of millstones from nearby mills to hinder the supply of British troops, but there are no records of the order's effect on Newlin Mill.

Southeastern Pennsylvania was the leading producer of grain in the colonial period and mills could be easily powered by the steep descent of the streams, called the Fall Line, in the area. By 1781 there were 127 gristmills in Chester County, which then included present-day Delaware County. The Newlin mill only served local and domestic needs and was known as a "country mill", rather than a "merchant mill" which would produce finer flour for urban and export markets.

The Newlin family owned the mill until 1817, selling to William Trimble, Jr. Thomas Newlin, who died in 1811, had remarried after his wife's death. Disagreements between his two sets of children resulted in a judgment of $11,326.30 against his estate, forcing the sale of the mill.

The Philadelphia and Baltimore Central Railroad was built through the property in 1859; this allowed the mill to market its flour in Philadelphia and Baltimore. A railway station was built in 1868 and Samuel Hill bought the mill in 1869. In 1942 the mill stopped commercial production and the buildings were used temporarily as a bookstore and an antique store. In 1956, Nicholas's eighth-generation descendant, E. Mortimer Newlin, purchased the property and later formed the Nicholas Newlin Foundation to restore and preserve the mill.  Restorations were completed in 1962, and 1992.

Buildings

Mill
A date stone on an exterior wall is marked "Nathan'l Mary Newlin 1704." The dam and the half-mile mill race, which provides the water that powers the mill, were built the same year. The original grindstone was imported from France. The mill was built of fieldstone into a hillside: the north side two stories, the south side one story high. The mill wheel was originally outside the mill and was probably breastshot. It was reconstructed in 1976, weighs  and measures , with 52 buckets. The water exits underground through the tail race and travels about  back to Chester Creek. The floors and mill machinery are supported by a hurst frame, an inner timber frame that is separated from the outer stone walls so that vibrations do not break the outer walls. The process of grinding the corn may be viewed at the mill.

Sometime after 1817 William Trimble expanded the mill and enclosed the mill wheel. It ground about 60,000 bushels of corn per year at that time. Sometime before 1850 the mill was refitted according to the Oliver Evans automated mill design and began to grind wheat flour.  In 1850 owner Casper Sharpless purchased 20,000 bushels of wheat for $22,000 and sold flour worth $30,000.

In 1870 the following products were produced:

A wood-framed upper story was added about 1890.

Warehouse

The warehouse is a -story stone building to the east of the lower level of the mill. It was built by Nathaniel Newlin after he built the mill to use as a dry goods store. It now serves as the Foundation's archive.

Miller's house

Built in 1739 of stone, it is adjacent to the south side of the mill. There are two rooms on each of the two floors, with a fireplace in each room, and a beehive oven attached to the kitchen. A third story was added about 1860 and removed during a restoration in the 1960s.

Trimble House

This house was built into the hill above the mill and the miller's house in 1742, also with four rooms. It was expanded by 1765 to accommodate William Trimble's growing family. The Newlin Foundation bought the house in 1998 and it is used as a private residence.

Railway station
The -story Gothic-style station was originally built in 1868–1869 by Samuel Hill. It served as a post office and polling station for the community of mill workers in the area. It burned down in 1890 and was rebuilt the next year, serving as a railway station until the 1930s. It is used now as the park office.

Park
The five original buildings form the core of a  park, which is mostly natural woodlands. A 1710 springhouse from a local farm was moved to the park in the 1970s and a small barn was moved from northern Delaware to the area behind the miller's house. In 1965 a log cabin was constructed, which is used for meetings, receptions, and parties. A new 18th Century style blacksmith shop replica was constructed in 1975. Two ball fields are also included in the park.

References

Sources
Wallace, Antony F. C., "The Mystique of Old Mills", Ch. 1 in 

Sellers, Nicholas, "Short History of Newlin Grist Mill", Ch. 2 in

External links

Newlin Grist Mill - official site
Millpictures.com

1704 establishments in Pennsylvania
Grinding mills on the National Register of Historic Places in Pennsylvania
Mill museums in Pennsylvania
Museums in Delaware County, Pennsylvania
History museums in Pennsylvania
Grinding mills in Pennsylvania
Parks in Delaware County, Pennsylvania
English-American history
National Register of Historic Places in Delaware County, Pennsylvania